Sinustrombus is a genus of sea snails, marine gastropod mollusks in the family Strombidae, the true conchs.

Species
Species within the genus Sinustrombus include:
S. latissimus (Linnaeus, 1758)
S. sinuatus (Lightfoot, 1786)
S. taurus (Reeve, 1857)

References

Strombidae